The Ustye is a river in Yaroslavl Oblast in Russia, a left tributary of the river Kotorosl (Volga's basin). The Ustye freezes up in November and breaks up in April.

References 

Rivers of Yaroslavl Oblast